Chase Long Beach was an American ska band from Long Beach, California, that formed in 2002 by former lead vocalist Karen Roberts and former bassist/vocalist Patrick Fitzgerald. In 2007, they released their first full-length album, LeBeC, produced by Aaron Barrett of Reel Big Fish. In 2009, Chase Long Beach signed to Victory Records, managed by Hardline Entertainment and released their second album, Gravity is What You Make It, on June 23, 2009.

Discography

Albums
 LeBeC (2007)
 Gravity is What You Make It (2009)

EPs
 Invasion of the Fuzzy Things (2004)
 Chase Long Beach Hosts a Molotov Cocktail Party (2006)

Members

Lineup
 Karen Roberts - Lead vocals (2002 - 2009)
 Patrick Fitzgerald - Bass guitar, Vocals (2002 - 2010) 
 Meagan Christy - Trumpet, Vocals (2005 - 2006; 2007 - 2012)
 Joe Cooper - Lead guitar (2007 - 2012)
 Tristan Dolce - Trumpet (2005 - 2012)
 Drew Pedersen - Trombone (2006 - 2012)
 Jose Rodriguez - Drums  (2003–2004, 2008 - 2012)
 Ryan Sandoval - Lead Guitar (2002 - 2007) 
 Emilio Corrales - Drums (2004 - 2008)
 Alana Mireles - Lead vocals (2010)
 Patrick Clancy - Bass (2010 - 2012)

References

External links
 Chase Long Beach Official MySpace

American ska punk musical groups
Third-wave ska groups
Musical groups established in 2002
Musical groups from Los Angeles
Victory Records artists
2002 establishments in California